Leonardo Briones Rodríguez (1 July 1929 – 16 August 2011) was a Mexican professional baseball player notable for his time in the Mexican League. Rodríguez's playing career began in 1949 and ended in 1971. He was elected to the Mexican Professional Baseball Hall of Fame in 1980.

He was born in Tlahualilo Municipality, Mexico and died on 16 August 2011.

References

External links

1929 births
2011 deaths
Minor league baseball players
Hollywood Stars players
Columbus Jets players
Mexican Baseball Hall of Fame inductees
Mexican baseball players
Mexican expatriate baseball players in the United States
Sportspeople from Durango